William Archibald Burnside Lowe (4 September 1875 – 8 April 1942) was an Australian rules footballer who played for the St. Kilda Football Club in the Victorian Football League (VFL).

References

External links 

1875 births
1942 deaths
Australian rules footballers from Melbourne
St Kilda Football Club players